Club Deportivo Malacateco-Coatepeque is a Guatemalan football club  based in Malacatán, San Marcos.

They play their home games in the Estadio Santa Lucía. They compete in the Liga Nacional, the top tier of Guatemalan football.

History
Nicknamed Los Toros, the club was founded on 8 September 1962 after a merger of clubs Morazán, Interrogación and Juvenil and by initiative of Humberto Bermúdez, Evelio de León, Felipe Sánchez, José María Munguía, José Rivera, Vicente López and Feliciano Boj. Forty five years later, they earned their historic promotion to Liga Mayor by defeating Juventud Retalteca 3–0 (3–2 agg.) in the Primera División de Ascenso 2007 Clausura final. This was also the first time in Primera División de Ascenso history that the same team won both the Apertura and Clausura tournaments, thus being automatically promoted without a need of an "extra" game. In 2008, they were relegated to Primera División after ending in last place in the Liga Mayor. In 2010, the club returned to the top division in Guatemala.

Carlos Mercedes Vásquez
In November 2010, first team squad member Carlos Mercedes Vásquez was kidnapped and murdered. A note on his body parts claimed he was killed for messing with another man's woman.

First Title
In the Apertura 2021, under Roberto Hernández, Malacateco claimed their biggest success in the club history by winning their first Liga Nacional title after defeating Comunicaciones 2-0 on 2 January 2022.

Rivals
Malacateco have a common rivalry with fellow San Marcos club Marquense, known as the “Derbi de San Marcos”.

Crest
Their crest consists of the face of a red bull and the nickname of the team above.

Stadium
The Estadio Santa Lucía is the official venue of the team, it is located in the municipality of Malacatán in San Marcos, has a capacity for 7,000 spectators and also has synthetic grass and electric lighting.

Honours

Domestic honours

Leagues
 Primera División de Ascenso
 Champions (3): Apertura 2006, Clausura 2007, Apertura 2009
 Liga Nacional de Guatemala and predecessors
 Champions (1): Apertura 2021

Performance in international competitions
CONCACAF League
2022 - Preliminary Round

Current squad

Managerial history
  Francisco "Avioneta" Pineda (1980–1981)
  Paulo César Barros (2007–2008)
  Adán Onelio Paniagua (2009)
  Franklin Cetre (2009–2010)
  Héctor Trujillo (2010–2012)
  Mauricio Wright (2012-2014)
  Paulo César Barros (2014)
   Emilio Umanzor (2014–2015)
   Nelson Ancheta  (2015)
  Rónald Gómez (2015-2016)
  Emilio Umanzor (2016-2017)
  Mauricio Wright (2017-2018)
  Rónald Gómez (2018-2021)
  Matías Tatangelo (2021)
  Roberto Hernández (2021-2022)
  Israel Hernández Pat (2022)
  Adrian Arias (2022- )

References

External links

Malacateco
Association football clubs established in 1962
1962 establishments in Guatemala